The 2018 Netball Quad Series was the fourth Netball Quad Series of test matches, contested by four of the five highest ranked nations in netball. New Zealand were the defending series champion, having won the previous series held in late 2017.

Australia were the winners of the series after winning all three of their matches.

Teams

Matches

Round 1

Round 2

Round 3

Standings
<noinclude>

See also

 Netball Quad Series

References

External links
  Fixtures and results for the series – Netball Australia website
 

2018
2018 in netball
2018 in Australian netball
2018 in New Zealand netball
2018 in English netball
2018 in South African women's sport
International netball competitions hosted by England
International netball competitions hosted by South Africa
Netball Quad Series
Netball Quad Series